The 2007–08 Liechtenstein Cup was the sixty-third season of Liechtenstein's annual cup competition. Seven clubs competed with a total of sixteen teams for one spot in the first qualifying round of the UEFA Cup. Defending champions were FC Vaduz, who have won the cup continuously since 1998.

First round

|colspan="3" style="background-color:#99CCCC"|

|-
|colspan="3" style="background-color:#99CCCC"|

|-
|colspan="3" style="background-color:#99CCCC"|

|}

Second round

|colspan="3" style="background-color:#99CCCC"|

|-
|colspan="3" style="background-color:#99CCCC"|

|}

Quarterfinals

|colspan="3" style="background-color:#99CCCC"|

|-
|colspan="3" style="background-color:#99CCCC"|

|-
|colspan="3" style="background-color:#99CCCC"|

|-
|colspan="3" style="background-color:#99CCCC"|

|}

Semifinals

|colspan="3" style="background-color:#99CCCC"|

|-
|colspan="3" style="background-color:#99CCCC"|

|}

Final

References

External links
Official site of the LFV
RSSSF

Liechtenstein Football Cup seasons
Liechtenstein Cup, 2007-08
Liechtenstein Cup, 2007-08